Live 1983–1989 is a compilation album of live performances by British pop duo Eurythmics, recorded throughout the 1980s, encompassing the years of their greatest commercial success. It was released in November 1993 by RCA Records.

The songs are presented chronologically across two discs, with most of the performances recorded close to the time of the original studio recording. For example, the performances of "Love Is a Stranger" and "Who's That Girl?", both from 1983 albums, are drawn from 1983 concerts and sound very similar to the studio versions.

Track listing
All songs written by Annie Lennox and David A. Stewart, except "When Tomorrow Comes", written by Lennox, Stewart and Patrick Seymour.

Disc one

Disc two

Disc three
Limited edition bonus acoustic CD. All songs recorded live at Palazzo dello Sport in Rome, 27 October 1989.

Notes
 "Would I Lie to You" abridged version that fades out at 3:35. Originally part of a medley that segued into a cover of the Beatles' "Day Tripper".
 "The Miracle of Love" is incorrectly credited as recorded in Paris, September 1989, though it was actually recorded in Sydney, Australia, on 14 February 1987 and was featured (in full) on the Eurythmics Live video release.

Personnel
 Annie Lennox
 David A. Stewart

The musicians involved are as follows (though no indication is made of the recordings they appear on):
 Clem Burke – drums
 Dick Cuthell – brass
 Martin Dobson – brass
 Malcolm Duncan – brass
 Sarah Fisher – backing vocals
 Mickey Gallager – bass
 Dean Garcia – bass
 Joniece Jamison – backing vocals
 Victor Martin – drums
 Chucho Merchán – bass
 Gill O'Donovan – backing vocals
 Suzie O'List – backing vocals
 Pete Phipps – drums
 David Plews – brass
 Eddi Reader – backing vocals
 Olle Romo – drums
 Margaret Ryder – backing vocals
 Patrick Seymour – keyboards
 Jimmy 'Z' Zavala – saxophone, harmonica

Charts

Certifications

References

1993 live albums
1993 compilation albums
Albums produced by David A. Stewart
Arista Records compilation albums
Arista Records live albums
Eurythmics compilation albums
RCA Records compilation albums
RCA Records live albums